Genyocerus albipennis, is a species of weevil endemic to Sri Lanka.

Description
In 1958, Victor Motschulsky formed the genus Genyocerus by citing G. albipennis as the type species. It is similar to the genus Diapus, but can be identified due to widely separated procoxae and the concave male fifth abdominal ventrite. This fifth abdominal ventrite is specialized for use as a shovel to remove frass from the gallery system. There is a considerable sexual dimorphism. Average body length is about 2.5 to 2.9 mm. Concavity of fifth ventrite without a longitudinal elevation. Lower half of frons lacks a median or lateral carinae. Pronotum with one pore on each side. Inner three teeth on elytral apex truncate. Elytral striae are not impressed on disc, but more finely punctured.

The beetle is only identified from Dipterocarpus zeylanicus.

References 

Curculionidae
Insects of Sri Lanka
Beetles described in 1859